Oak Hill Memorial Park is a cemetery in San Jose, California, United States. Founded in 1847, it is the oldest and largest secular cemetery in California. Oak Hill is the northernmost hill in the San Juan Bautista Hills of South San Jose.

History

The cemetery's origins date back to 1839, during the Mexican period of California, when city officials of the Pueblo de San José de Guadalupe began to bury the dead on the northern side of the San Juan Bautista Hills, in modern-day South San Jose. It was known simply as the Pueblo Graveyard.

In 1847, following the American Conquest of California, surveyor Chester Lyman, along with William Fisher of Rancho Laguna Seca, laid out an official city cemetery on a nearby tract, which was simply known as the Pueblo Cemetery, until 1858, when it was renamed to Oak Hill Cemetery (Oak Hill being the northernmost hill of the San Juan Bautista Hills where the cemetery is laid out).

When the city sold the cemetery to A.J. Hocking in 1933, its name was changed for the final time to Oak Hill Memorial Park. The Hocking family's tenure of ownership of the cemetery was marked by the construction of new mausoleums, notably the Azalea and Parkview Terraces, as well as the construction of the Fountain of the Apostles and the Chapel of the Oaks. In 1986, Oak Hill was finally sold to Dignity Memorial.

Landmarks

The Great Mausoleum is the most notable landmark at Oak Hill. It built in a historic Romanesque Spanish Revival architecture.

The Sunrise Hill Cross is located atop of Sunrise Hill, the small summit just next to Oak Hill.

The Fountain of the Apostles features twelve marble statues of the Apostles of Christ surrounding the inner font.

The cemetery has an Overland Pioneers Memorial to early American settlers of the Santa Clara Valley.

There is a plot dedicated to members of the Grand Army of the Republic.

Notable interments

Numerous notable persons are interred at Oak Hill:
 Richard Amory (1927–1981), writer, author of Song of the Loon (1966)
 Frank Arellanes (1882–1918), baseball player
 Esto Bates Broughton (1890–1956), one of the first four women elected to the California State Assembly
 Sylvia Browne (1936–2013), psychic medium
 Earl Butler, founder of Butler Amusements
 Hal Chase (1883–1947), baseball player
 John Smith Chipman (1800–1869), U.S. Congressman
 Sara J. Dorr (1855–1924), temperance activist
 Bernice C. Downing (1878–1940), the first women in California to publish their own newspaper, the Santa Clara Journal
 Nellie Blessing Eyster (1836–1922), writer and social reformer
 Arthur M. Free (1879–1953), U.S. Congressman
 Elizabeth Eleanor D’Arcy Gaw (1868–1944), artist
 Levi Goodrich (1822–1887), architect
 Brooke Hart (1911–1933), kidnapping and murder victim (son of businessman Alexander Hart)
 Everis Anson Hayes (1855–1942), U.S. Congressman
 Ren Kelly (1899–1963), baseball player
 Sarah Knox-Goodrich (1825–1903), women's rights activist
 Sarah Massey Overton (1850–1914), African-American and women's rights activist
 William Penn Lyon (1822–1913), Chief Justice of the Wisconsin Supreme Court, Civil War General (Union)
 Paul Masson (1859–1940), early California vintner
 Charles Henry McKiernan (1825–1892), early settler in the Santa Cruz Mountains
 John McNaught (1849–1938), early journalist and writer
 Emelie Melville (1852–1932), American actress
 Norman Mineta (1931–2022), United States Secretary of Transportation
 José Noriega (1796–1869), Alcalde of San José
 Benjamin Raborg (1871–1918), American artist
 James F. Reed (1800–1874), organizing member of the Donner Party
 Lester Reiff (1877–1948), jockey
 Fred Sanborn (1899–1961), Vaudeville performer
 Samuel Morgan Shortridge (1861–1952), U.S. Senator
 Eugene T. Sawyer (1846–1924), newspaper editor and writer of the Nick Carter detective series
 Edward O. Smith (1817–1892), Mayor of Decatur, Illinois, Illinois State Senator, and California pioneer
 John Townsend (?–1850), early Alcalde of San Francisco
 Gus Triandos (1930–2013), baseball player
 Edward Alexander Walker (1864–1946), Medal of Honor recipient for service in the Boxer Rebellion
 Carrie Stevens Walter (1846–1907), poet and co-founder of the Sempervirens Club

Gallery

See also
 List of cemeteries in California

References

External links

 Oak Hill Memorial Park website
 

Parks in San Jose, California
1847 establishments in Alta California
Cemeteries in Santa Clara County, California